Wath (Park Road) Secondary Modern School was a secondary modern school in Wath-upon-Dearne, then in the West Riding of Yorkshire in the United Kingdom. It closed in December 1963, with the neighbouring Wath Grammar School expanding to replace it.
 Notable Teachers 
 Colin Fidler - Head of Mathematics 
 Betty Corbridge - Senior Mistress

History
The school was called Wath Park Road Council School in the 1930s.

The school merged into Wath Grammar School in January 1964. Park Road's old building become Wath's second site. Initially, it continued to be used as the basic wing of the school for former secondary modern students. It was then used as Wath's first form (later Year 7) wing until it was demolished in 2005.

References

Defunct schools in Rotherham
Educational institutions disestablished in 1963
1963 disestablishments in England